Terry Bradley (born 1965, in Belfast) is an artist from Northern Ireland. His early life was spent growing up just off the notorious Shankill Road where his mother tried to keep him inside and away from the “Troubles” outside their front door.

Life
Bradley created his first painting when he was 14 years old and is a self-taught artist. He and his two brothers later set up and ran a factory manufacturing and exporting full lead mouth blown crystal. The company had to close its doors after four years.

Bradley then turned to his interest in art and fashion. He opened his own clothes shop in the trendy university area of the city. Called “Retro” the shop was soon a leader in fashion for the clothes conscious of Belfast. Terry's was the first shop to stock Red or Dead shoes and he had a regular Saturday DJ playing in the tiny outlet. He sold hand painted jeans and one-off shirts and jackets that he imported from all over the world. A few years later he moved to Dublin in 1989. Bradley initially started modelling clothes for friends to make ends meet. During this time however, he was busy painting and drawing in his spare time. A chance conversation with John Reynolds, the owner of the famous POD club in Dublin, lead to Bradley's first solo art exhibition. The night was a huge success and Terry started to make some money.

He now exhibits in Dublin, Belfast, London and Spain and is planning his first solo exhibition for the USA later this year. Followed by Roma Chang. His natural aversion to the establishment has made it difficult for him to fit into a typical art gallery mould, and he still likes to exhibit in the bars and clubs that he feels most at home in. He sells his work all around the world and his art has been used by Nokia for the cover of a limited edition mobile phone. Bradley is able to paint full-time and explore the voyeuristic side of his nature that he first discovered as a child. His work mostly centres on strong women and ex-models from Dublin, and more recently Paris. His latest work is inspired by the era of the Belle Époque in France and the contrasts and similarities with the Burlesque dancers of New York. He has also recently started exploring the colourful characters from the Belfast dockland area known as Sailortown.

References

External links 
 terrybradley.com

Painters from Northern Ireland
Living people
1965 births
Artists from Belfast